Sergei Grigoryevich Oborin (born 12 December 1956) is a Russian professional football coach and a former player.

Coaching career
On 16 October 2019, he left FC Fakel Voronezh by mutual consent after the club gained 3 draws and 3 losses in last 6 league games and dropped to last place in the FNL table.

References

External links
 

1956 births
People from Lysva
Living people
Soviet footballers
Russian footballers
Association football goalkeepers
FC Tyumen players
Russian football managers
FC Amkar Perm managers
PFC Krylia Sovetov Samara managers
FC Sibir Novosibirsk managers
Russian Premier League managers
FC Fakel Voronezh managers
FC Zvezda Perm players
Sportspeople from Perm Krai